Income is the consumption and saving opportunity gained by an entity within a specified timeframe, which is generally expressed in monetary terms. Income is difficult to define conceptually and the definition may be different across fields. For example, a person's income in an economic sense may be different from their income as defined by law.

An extremely important definition of income is Haig–Simons income, which defines income as Consumption + Change in net worth and is widely used in economics.

For households and individuals in the United States, income is defined by tax law as a sum that includes any wage, salary, profit, interest payment, rent, or other form of earnings received in a calendar year. Discretionary income is often  defined as gross income minus taxes and other deductions (e.g., mandatory pension contributions), and is widely used as a basis to compare the welfare of taxpayers.

In the field of public economics, the concept may comprise the accumulation of both monetary and non-monetary consumption ability, with the former (monetary) being used as a proxy for total income.

For a firm, gross income can be defined as sum of all revenue minus the cost of goods sold. Net income nets out expenses: net income equals revenue minus cost of goods sold, expenses, depreciation, interest, and taxes.

Economic definitions

Full and Haig–Simons income

"Full income" refers to the accumulation of both the monetary and the non-monetary consumption-ability of any given entity, such as a person or a household. According to what the economist Nicholas Barr describes as the "classical definition of income" (the 1938 Haig–Simons definition): "income may be defined as the... sum of (1) the market value of rights exercised in consumption and (2) the change in the value of the store of property rights..." Since the consumption potential of non-monetary goods, such as leisure, cannot be measured, monetary income may be thought of as a proxy for full income. As such, however, it is criticized for being unreliable, i.e. failing to accurately reflect affluence (and thus the consumption opportunities) of any given agent. It omits the utility a person may derive from non-monetary income and, on a macroeconomic level, fails to accurately chart social welfare. According to Barr, "in practice money income as a proportion of total income varies widely and unsystematically. Non-observability of full-income prevent a complete characterization of the individual opportunity set, forcing us to use the unreliable yardstick of money income.

Factor income
In economics, "factor income" is the return accruing for a person, or a nation, derived from the "factors of production": rental income, wages generated by labor, the interest created by capital, and profits from entrepreneurial ventures.

The basic equation for this is

This equation implies two things. First buying one more unit of good x implies buying  less units of good y.  So,  is the relative price of a unit of x as to the number of units given up in y.  Second, if the price of x falls for a fixed  and fixed  then its relative price falls.  The usual hypothesis, the law of demand, is that the quantity demanded of x would increase at the lower price. The analysis can be generalized to more than two goods.

The theoretical generalization to more than one period is a multi-period wealth and income constraint. For example, the same person can gain more productive skills or acquire more productive income-earning assets to earn a higher income. In the multi-period case, something might also happen to the economy beyond the control of the individual to reduce (or increase) the flow of income. Changing measured income and its relation to consumption over time might be modeled accordingly, such as in the permanent income hypothesis.

Legal definitions

Definitions under the Internal Revenue Code

26 U.S. Code § 61 - Gross income defined. There are also some statutory exclusions from income.

Definition under US Case law

Income is an "undeniable accessions to wealth, clearly realized, and over which the taxpayer has complete dominion." Commentators say that this is a pretty good definition of income.

Taxable income is usually lower than Haig-Simons income. This is because unrealized appreciation (e.g., the increase in the value of stock over the course of a year) is economic income but not taxable income, and because there are many statutory exclusions from taxable income, including workman's compensation, SSI, gifts, child support, and in-kind government transfers.

Accounting definitions

The International Accounting Standards Board (IASB) uses the following definition: "Income is increases in economic benefits during the accounting period in the form of inflows or enhancements of assets or decreases of liabilities that result in increases in equity, other than those relating to contributions from equity participants." [F.70] (IFRS Framework).

Previously the IFRS conceptual framework (4.29) stated: "The definition of income encompasses both revenue and gains. Revenue arises in the course of the ordinary activities of an entity and is referred to by a variety of different names including sales, fees, interest, dividends, royalties and rent. 4.30: Gains represent other items that meet the definition of income and may, or may not, arise in the course of the ordinary activities of an entity. Gains represent increases in economic benefits and as such are no different in nature from revenue. Hence, they are not regarded as constituting a separate element in this Conceptual Framework."

The current IFRS conceptual framework  (4.68) no longer draws a distinction between revenue and gains.  Nevertheless, the distinction continues to be drawn at the standard and reporting levels.  For example, IFRS 9.5.7.1 states: "A gain or loss on a financial asset or financial liability that is measured at fair value shall be recognised in profit or loss ..." while the IASB defined IFRS XBRL taxonomy  includes OtherGainsLosses, GainsLossesOnNetMonetaryPosition and similar items.

US GAAP does not define income but does define comprehensive income (CON 8.4.E75): Comprehensive income is the change in equity of a business entity during a period from transactions and other events and circumstances from nonowner sources. It includes all changes in equity during a period except those resulting from investments by owners and distributions to owners.

According to John Hicks' definitions, income "is the maximum amount which can be spent during a period if there is to be an expectation of maintaining intact, the capital value of prospective receipts (in money terms)”.

"Nonincome"

Debt 
Borrowing or repaying money is not income under any definition, for either the borrower or the lender. Interest and forgiveness of debt are income.

Psychic income 
"Nonmonetary joy," such as watching a sunset or having sex, simply is not income. Similarly, nonmonetary suffering, such as heartbreak or labor, are not negative income. This may seem trivial, but the noninclusion of psychic income has important effects in economics and tax policy. It encourages people to find happiness in nonmonetary, nontaxable ways, and means that reported income may overstate or understate the wellbeing of a given individual.

Income growth 
Income per capita has been increasing steadily in most countries. Many factors contribute to people having a higher income, including education, globalisation and favorable political circumstances such as economic freedom and peace. Increases in income also tend to lead to people choosing to work fewer hours.
Developed countries (defined as countries with a "developed economy") have higher incomes as opposed to developing countries tending to have lower incomes.

Income inequality
Income inequality is the extent to which income is distributed in an uneven manner. It can be measured by various methods, including the Lorenz curve and the Gini coefficient. Many economists argue that certain amounts of inequality are necessary and desirable but that excessive inequality leads to efficiency problems and social injustice. Thereby necessitating initiatives like the United Nations Sustainable Development Goal 10 aimed at reducing inequality.

National income, measured by statistics such as net national income (NNI), measures the total income of individuals, corporations, and government in the economy.  For more information see Measures of national income and output.

Income in philosophy and ethics
Throughout history, many have written about the impact of income on morality and society. Saint Paul wrote 'For the love of money is a root of all kinds of evil:' (1 Timothy 6:10 (ASV)).

Some scholars have come to the conclusion that material progress and prosperity, as manifested in continuous income growth at both the individual and the national level, provide the indispensable foundation for sustaining any kind of morality. This argument was explicitly given by Adam Smith in his Theory of Moral Sentiments, and has more recently been developed by Harvard economist Benjamin Friedman in his book The Moral Consequences of Economic Growth.

Income and health
A landmark systematic review from Harvard University researchers in the Cochrane Collaboration found that income given in the form of unconditional cash transfers leads to reductions in disease, improvements in food security and dietary diversity, increases in children's school attendance, decreases in extreme poverty, and higher health care spending.

History
Income is conventionally denoted by "Y" in economics. John Hicks used "I" for income, but Keynes wrote to him in 1937, "after trying both, I believe it is easier to use Y for income and I for investment." Some consider Y as an alternative letter for the phoneme I in languages like Spanish, although Y as the "Greek I" was actually pronounced like the modern German ü or the phonetic /y/.

See also

 Basic income
 Comprehensive income
 Income tax
 Unpaid work
 Revenue

References

Further reading
 D. Usher (1987). "real income", The New Palgrave: A Dictionary of Economics, v. 4, pp. 104–5.